Jules François Bocandé (25 November 1958 – 7 May 2012), was a Senegalese professional footballer who played as a striker. Bocandé is regarded as one of West Africa's best footballers of all time and was named an African Football Legend by CAF in 2009.

Career

Club
Bocandé was one of the first Senegalese footballers in France and was Ligue 1's top goalscorer in the 1985–86 season with 23 goals.

International
Jules Bocandé participated with the Senegal national team in three editions of Africa Cup of Nations in 1986, 1990 and 1992.

Personal life
He was the father of former FC Metz professional player Daniel Bocandé. He died in Metz at the age of 53 during an operation.

References

External links
 
 Profile - FC Metz
 Profile
 Casa Sport

1958 births
2012 deaths
People from Ziguinchor
Association football forwards
Senegalese footballers
Senegal international footballers
1986 African Cup of Nations players
1990 African Cup of Nations players
1992 African Cup of Nations players
Casa Sports players
R.F.C. Seraing (1904) players
FC Metz players
Paris Saint-Germain F.C. players
OGC Nice players
RC Lens players
S.C. Eendracht Aalst players
Ligue 1 players
Senegalese expatriate footballers
Expatriate footballers in Belgium
Expatriate footballers in France
Senegalese expatriate sportspeople in Belgium
Senegalese expatriate sportspeople in France
1994 African Cup of Nations managers
Senegalese football managers